Larko Doguape is a Nauruan weightlifter. He represented Nauru at the 2019 World Weightlifting Championships, as well as the 2018 Commonwealth Games.

References

External links

Living people
2000 births
Nauruan male weightlifters